Kirchberg is a town in the Zwickau district, in Saxony, Germany. It is situated at the western end of the Ore Mountains, 11 km south of Zwickau.

Notable people 

 Christoph Graupner (1683-1760), musician and composer. The high school in Kirchberg is named after him.
 Robert Seidel (1850-1933), politician, took part in the founding congress of the SPD. There is a street named after him in Kirchberg.

References 

Zwickau (district)